Maria Fiè (11 October 1940 – 27 August 1989), also known professionally as Gloria Milland was an Italian actress of peplum and Spaghetti Western films.

Life 
Born in Cagliari, Sardinia, she debuted in 1959 with her real name, but changed it shortly later, following a fashion of the time for American-sounding stage names. In 1960s she was very active in light comedies and adventure (pepla) films, often in main roles, then did a few spaghetti westerns, but dissatisfied with her career, she chose to retire from show business in the late 1960s.

Milland died on August 27, 1989 in Ladispoli, Italy.

Filmography

1959: Fantasmi e ladri
1959: Girl at the club - Girl at the club
1960: La strada dei giganti
1960: My Friend, Dr. Jekyll - Mara
1960: Rapina al quartiere Ovest
1960: Ferragosto in bikini - Elena
1961: The Thief of Baghdad - Amina's Handmaid (uncredited)
1961: Goliath Against the Giants - Princess Elea
1961: Bellezze sulla spiaggia
1961: Scandali al mare - Nicoletta
1961: Le magnifiche sette - Erika
1962: Ten Italians for One German - Assunta aka Nena - Ferroni's wife
1962: The Golden Arrow
1962: The Fury of Achilles - Briseis
1962: The Rebel Gladiators - Marzia
1962: Twist, lolite e vitelloni - Elena
1963: The Black Duke - Caterina Sforza
1963: Goliath and the Rebel Slave - Zoé
1963: Le tre spade di Zorro - Virginia
1964: Revenge of the Musketeers - Olimpia Mancini
1964: Samson vs. the Giant King - Nadia
1964: Delitto allo specchio - Franca
1964: Hercules Against the Barbarians - Arias
1964: I tre spietati - Louise Walker
1964: The Seven from Texas - Maria
1965: Challenge of the Gladiator - Livia
1965: Seven Hours of Gunfire - Calamity Jane
1965: Hands of a Gunfighter - Miriam Murphy
1965: Doc, Hands of Steel - Norma O'Connor
1966: The Tough One
1967: ...E divenne il più spietato bandito del sud - Mrs. Kathleen Bonney
1967: Aquí mando yo - Elisa
1967: Hate for Hate - Maria Consuelo Cooper
1967: Un uomo e una colt - Carmencita (final film role)

References

External links

 

1940 births
1989 deaths
People from Cagliari
Italian actresses
Sardinian women